Javier Montez (December 5, 1929 – December 6, 2003) was an American middle-distance runner. He competed in the men's 1500 metres at the 1952 Summer Olympics.

References

External links
 

1929 births
2003 deaths
Athletes (track and field) at the 1952 Summer Olympics
American male middle-distance runners
Olympic track and field athletes of the United States
Place of birth missing